Haijian 50 is a Chinese patrol ship under the flag of the East China Sea Fleet from the East China Sea Branch under the command of the State Oceanic Administration of China, which was commissioned in June 2011.

History
Haijian 50s construction started in February 2010 at Wuchang Shipbuilding, Wuhan, China. She was christened and commissioned in June 2011. Its design is the basis for the subsequent construction of five ships within the same 3,000-tonnage class, which Wuchang Shipbuilding received an order for in January 2013.

Configuration and equipment 

She can carry a helicopter on a helipad or in a hangar. The default helicopter model is Harbin Z-9.

She has an electrical propulsion system that relies on propellers instead of a rudder for changing direction. Auxiliary propellers give her the capability to rotate in place. She is equipped with a dynamic positioning system that can hold its position even under the conditions of a level 7 wind speed on the Beaufort scale. The vessel carries an onboard desalination system.

Cruise operations 
On September 14, 2012, CMS 50 arrived at waters around the disputed Diaoyu Islands and started cruise operations.

References

Ships of the China Marine Surveillance
2011 ships